Kunwar Natwar Singh, IFS (born 16 May 1931) is an Indian diplomat and politician who served as the Minister of External Affairs from May 2004 to December 2005.

Singh was selected into the Indian Foreign Service, one of the most competitive and prestigious government services, in 1953. In 1984, he resigned from the service to contest elections as a member of the Indian National Congress party. He won the election and served as a union minister of state until 1989. Thereafter, he had a patchy political career until being made India's foreign minister in 2004. However, 18 months later, he had to resign under a cloud after the UN's Volcker committee named both him and the Congress party to which he belonged as beneficiaries of illegal pay-offs in the Iraqi oil scam.

Early life and education
The fourth son of Govind Singh of jagheena and his wife Prayag Kaur, Singh was born in the princely state of Bharatpur to an aristocrat Jat Hindu family related to the ruling dynasty of Bharatpur. He attended Mayo College and Scindia School, Gwalior, both traditionally for Indian princely clans and nobles, and took an undergraduate degree at St. Stephen's College, Delhi. He subsequently studied at Corpus Christi College, Cambridge University and was a visiting scholar for a period at Peking University in China.

Diplomatic career
Singh joined the Indian Foreign Service in 1953 and served for 31 years. One of his earliest assignments was in Beijing, China (1956–58). He was then posted to New York City at the Permanent Mission of India (1961–66) and as India's representative to executive board of UNICEF (1962–66). He served on several important UN committees between 1963 and 1966. In 1966, he was posted to the Prime Minister's Secretariat under Indira Gandhi. He served as India's Ambassador to Poland from 1971 to 1973, India's Deputy High Commissioner to U.K. from 1973 to 1977 and India's Ambassador to Pakistan from 1980 to 1982. He was part of the Indian delegation to the Heads of Commonwealth Meeting in Kingston, Jamaica in 1975. He was an Indian Delegate to the 30th Session of the United Nations General Assembly, New York, Heads of Commonwealth Meeting, Lusaka, Zambia in 1979 and the 35th Session of the United Nations General Assembly, New York. He also accompanied Indira Gandhi on her State visit to the US in 1982. He served as an Executive Trustee, United Nations Institute for Training and Research (UNITAR) appointed by the Secretary-General, United Nations for six years (1981–86). He also served on the Expert Group appointed by the Secretary General of the Commonwealth, London in 1982. He was appointed Secretary-General of the Seventh Non-aligned Summit in New Delhi held in 1983 and Chief Coordinator of the Commonwealth Heads of Government Meeting (CHOGM) in New Delhi in the same year. He served as Secretary in the Ministry of External Affairs from March 1982 to November 1984.

He received the Padma Bhushan, the third highest civilian award in India from the Government of India, in 1984.

Political career

In 1984, after resigning from the Indian Foreign Service, Singh joined the Congress party and was elected to the 8th Lok Sabha from Bharatpur constituency in Rajasthan. In 1985, he was sworn in as a minister of state (who is a minister, but one level below a cabinet minister) and allotted the portfolios of steel, coal and mines, and agriculture. In 1986, he became minister of state for external affairs. In that capacity, he was elected President of the UN Conference on Disarmament and Development held in New York in 1987, and also led the Indian delegation to the 42nd Session of the UN General Assembly.
Singh remained a minister of state for external affairs until the Congress party lost power after being defeated in the general elections of 1989. In those elections, he contested and lost the Mathura seat in Uttar Pradesh. The Congress party returned to power after the elections of 1991, with P.V. Narasimha Rao as Prime Minister since Rajiv Gandhi has lately been assassinated. At this time, Singh was not an MP and could not be a minister. His importance lay solely in perceived proximity to the Sonia Gandhi, of which he was a staunch and avowed loyalist. He duly developed differences with the Prime Minister and left the party along with N.D. Tiwari and Arjun Singh, to form a new political party, All India Indira Congress. In 1998, after P.V. Narasimha Rao had been shunted into oblivion and Sonia Gandhi had regained complete control of the party, the three family loyalists merged their new party into the Congress party and returned into the service of the Gandhis.

Singh was rewarded with a ticket to contest the general elections of 1998, and returned to parliament after a gap of nine years, when he was elected to the short-lived 12th Lok Sabha (1998–99) from Bharatpur. However, he had to sit in the opposition benches, and then he lost the elections of 1999. After a further hiatus of three years, he was elected (indirectly) to the Rajya Sabha from Rajasthan in 2002. The Congress party came back to power in 2004, and Prime Minister Manmohan Singh appointed Natwar Singh as the Minister for External affairs.

Oil for Food scandal
Singh assumed office on 23 May 2004 as India's minister for external affairs. His tenure proved controversial.

On 27 October 2005, while Singh was abroad on an official visit, the Independent Inquiry Committee headed by Paul Volcker released the report on its investigation of corruption in the Oil-for-Food program. It stated inter alia that "India's Congress party" and Natwar Singh's family were non-contractual (corrupt) beneficiaries of the Oil for Food programme. The report stated that Natwar Singh, his son Jagat Singh and Jagat's childhood friend Andaleeb Sehgal, were associated with a company called Hamdan Exports, which acted as an intermediary for illegal sales of oil to a Swiss firm named Masefield AG. In return for these illegal sales, Masefield paid kickbacks (termed "surcharges"), partly to Saddam Hussein's regime and partly to Natwar Singh and others. It was alleged that such kickbacks were Hussein's way of securing support from politicians around the world and that this benefit influenced Natwar Singh to lobby against US policies in Iraq (in particular, US sanctions on Saddam Hussein).

Anil Mathrani, then Indian Ambassador to Croatia and formerly a close aide to K. Natwar Singh, alleged that Natwar Singh had used an official visit to Iraq to procure oil coupons for Jagat Singh from Saddam's regime.

The long knives

On 26 March 2006, the Indian Enforcement Directorate (ED) announced that it had finally tracked a sum of eighty million rupees, transferred from London-based Non-resident Indian businessman Aditya Khanna's bank account to his own NRI account in a Delhi bank, and later withdrawn from this account to be allegedly distributed among Indian beneficiaries of the scam. An old family connection between this businessman (Aditya Khanna) and Natwar Singh's family was dredged up. In August the same year, the Justice Pathak committee, which was investigating the case, released its judgment accepting this averment. The committee found that Andaleeb Sehgal, a friend of Jagat Singh, and Aditya Khanna, a relative of Natwar Singh, received financial payoffs by procuring oil coupons based on recommendations given by Natwar Singh. Importantly, the committee found that there was no evidence linking the Congress party with these dealings. Based on this credible report, Jagat Singh was expelled from the primary membership of the Congress party, Natwar Singh was dismissed from the Cabinet and his party membership was suspended.

Natwar Singh then resigned from the Congress party. He announced his resignation at a Bharatiya Janata Party-sponsored rally of Natwar Singh's own Jat community held at Jaipur in the presence of Vasundhara Raje, then Chief Minister of Rajasthan. On this occasion, Natwar Singh not only asserted his innocence but also launched a bitter attack on Sonia Gandhi for having failed to defend or support him.

However, Natwar Singh did not join the BJP. Instead, in mid-2008, both Singh and his son Jagat joined Mayawati's Bahujan Samaj Party, only to be expelled by that party within four months (in November 2008) for alleged indiscipline, anti-party activities and "lack of faith" in the ideology of the Bahujan Samaj Movement. In fact, Singh had been demanding a Rajya Sabha seat (which had apparently been promised before he joined the party) and Mayawati had changed her mind on that matter. After this episode, Natwar Singh, having suffered several personal tragedies in a short period, retired from public life.

Personal life
In August 1967, Singh married Maharajkumari Heminder Kaur (b. June 1939), the eldest daughter of the last Maharaja of Patiala State, Yadavindra Singh, and the sister of Captain Amarinder Singh, the present titular Maharaja of Patiala and former chief minister of Punjab. Heminder's mother Mohinder Kaur was also active in public life.

The couple had a son, Jagat Singh (b. August 1968) and a daughter, Ritu Kaur (b. November 1970). Jagat Singh was himself politically active as the general secretary of the Congress Party youth wing.

Autobiography
In August 2014, Natwar Singh's autobiography, One Life is Not Enough, was released. The book is no-holds-barred account of his political career, providing an insider view on the various machinations of Delhi's political circles. The book reveals many sensitive developments during Indira Gandhi's, Rajiv Gandhi's, Narasimha Rao's and Manmohan Singh's regimes. It also describes the changing contours of Natwar Singh's close but complex political relationship with Indian National Congress president Sonia Gandhi over the years. The book presents Natwar Singh's account of the controversial Volcker report and the various political motions that took place in the background leading up to his resignation.

Sonia Gandhi has responded to the book by rubbishing its contents. She also expressed the intention to write her autobiography to reveal the truth.

Books published
 E.M.Forster : A Tribute (on Forster's Eighty Fifth Birthday), editor, with Contributions by Ahmed Ali, Narayana Menon, Raja Rao & Santha Rama Rau, New York, 1964
 The Legacy of Nehru: A Memorial Tribute, New York, 1965
 Tales from Modern India, New York, 1966
 Stories from India, London, 1971
 Maharaja Suraj Mal, 1707-63: His Life and Times, London, 1981
 Curtain Raisers, Delhi, 1984
 Profiles & Letters, Delhi, 1997
 The Magnificent Maharaja Bhupinder Singh of Patiala (1891–1938), Delhi, 1997
 Heart to Heart, Delhi, 2003.
Yours Sincerely, December 2009.
 Walking with Lions: Tales from a Diplomatic Past, Released by Hamid Ansari, March 2013.
 One Life is Not Enough: An Autobiography, August 2014.
Treasured Epistles, August 2018.

See also
Dr. S. Jaishankar
Navtej Sarna
 Syed Akbaruddin
Taranjit Singh Sandhu
Harsh Vardhan Shringla

References

1931 births
Living people
Rajasthani politicians
Indian National Congress politicians
Ministers for External Affairs of India
Recipients of the Padma Bhushan in civil service
Alumni of Corpus Christi College, Cambridge
Fellows of Corpus Christi College, Cambridge
Peking University alumni
Rajya Sabha members from Rajasthan
Indian diplomats
People from Bharatpur district
Rajasthani people
Scindia School alumni
India MPs 1984–1989
India MPs 1998–1999
Lok Sabha members from Rajasthan
Indian Foreign Service officers
All India Indira Congress (Tiwari) politicians